Bolghan (also Romanized as Bolghān) is a village in Harm Rural District, Juyom District, Larestan County, Fars Province, Iran. At the 2006 census, its population was 2,284, in 484 families.

References 

Populated places in Larestan County